Pont-Aven School encompasses works of art influenced by the Breton town of Pont-Aven and its surroundings. Originally the term applied to works created in the artists' colony at Pont-Aven, which started to emerge in the 1850s and lasted until the beginning of the 20th century. Many of the artists were inspired by the works of Paul Gauguin, who spent extended periods in the area in the late 1880s and early 1890s. Their work is frequently characterised by the bold use of pure colour and their Symbolist choice of subject matter.

Background
Pont-Aven is a commune of the Finistère département, in Brittany, France, some distance inland from where the river Aven meets the Atlantic Ocean. From the 1850s painters began to frequent the village of Pont-Aven, wanting to spend their summers away from the city, on a low budget in a picturesque place not yet spoilt by tourism. Gauguin first worked in Pont-Aven in 1886. When he returned in 1888, the situation had changed: Pont-Aven was already crowded, and Gauguin looked for an alternative place to work which he found, in 1889, in Le Pouldu (today part of the community of Clohars-Carnoët), some miles off to the East at the mouth of the river Laïta, traditionally the border of the Morbihan département. There, Gauguin, accompanied by Meijer de Haan, Charles Filiger and for a while by Sérusier, spent the winter of 1889/1890 and several months afterwards.

History

The opening of the railway line from Paris to Quimper in 1862 encouraged tourism in Brittany. The first group of artists to arrive in Pont-Aven during the summer of 1866 consisted of American art students from Philadelphia including Robert Wylie, Charles Way, Earl Shinn and Howard Roberts. They were soon joined by three other Americans, Benjamin Champney, Frederick Bridgeman and Moses Wright, by two English painters, Lewis and Carraway, and by two Frenchmen. Over the next 15 years, the reputation of the colony spread far and wide, attracting many other painters. Jean-Léon Gérôme, one of the leading French Academic painters, encouraged his American students to go there, while French landscape artists such as William Bouguereau, Louis-Nicolas Cabat and Paul Sébillot also spent summers in the village. Among the other foreigners to visit were Herman van den Anker from the Netherlands, Augustus Burke from Ireland and Paul Peel from Canada. The English illustrator Randolph Caldecott visited in 1880. He illustrated Henry Blackburn's Breton Folk: An Artistic Tour of Brittany (1880), one of the most popular guide-books of the time. His naive illustrations caught the imagination of the avant-garde visiting artists and Gauguin in particular, who is known to have imitated Caldecott's style in his drawings his first summer at Pont-Aven.

There were three hotels ready to accommodate visitors: the Hôtel de Voyageurs, the Hôtel du Lion d'Or and the Pension Gloanec. The Pension Gloanec, where Gauguin and his circle lodged, was especially cheap. When Blackburn visited it offered demi-pension, i.e. board, breakfast and evening meal with cider thrown in, for just sixty francs a month. The artists were attracted by the beauty of the surrounding countryside and the low cost of living. Many of them were looking for a new point of departure, hoping to break away from the Academic style of the École des Beaux-Arts and from Impressionism which was beginning to decline. Brittany opened up new horizons with its language, traditional dress, fervent Catholic belief, an oral tradition and the ubiquitous presence of granite crosses and churches.

The two most innovative painters to arrive on the scene were Paul Gauguin and Émile Bernard. Gauguin had reached in Pont-Aven in July 1886 while Bernard came later in the summer. When the two met again two years later, they consolidated their relationship. Bernard showed Gauguin his Pardon à Pont-Aven (1888), which some believe inspired Gauguin to paint his Vision après le sermon, Bernard claiming he was the first to adopt the approach, which became known as Synthetism. Other artists who stayed with Gauguin, first at the Pension Gloanec in Pont-Aven and later at the Buvette de la Plage in Le Pouldu, were Charles Filiger, Meijer de Haan, Charles Laval, Robert Bevan, Roderic O'Conor, Émile Schuffenecker, Armand Séguin and Władysław Ślewiński. After his first voyage to Tahiti in 1891, Gauguin returned to Pont-Aven for the last time in 1894, once again staying with his circle of friends at the Pension Gloanec.

Synthetism

The style developed in Pont-Aven by Gauguin and Bernard was known as Synthetism as it was designed to synthetise or combine images, producing a new result which was quite different from Impressionism. It relied on a number of principles including the abandonment of faithful representation, the creation of a work based on the artist's memory of the subject but reflecting his feelings while painting, bold application of pure colour, the absence of perspective and shading, the application of Cloisonnism's flat forms separated by dark contours, and geometrical composition free of any unnecessary detail and trimmings.

Gallery

Artists working in Pont-Aven (or Le Pouldu)
Arranged by year of arrival: 

 Otto Weber (1832–1888), German, 1863
 Henry Bacon (1839–1912), American, 1864
 Charles Way, American,  1864
 Robert Wylie (1839–1877), American, 1864 until death
 Frederick Bridgman, American, (1847–1928), 1866
 Benjamin Champney (1817–1907), American, 1866
 Earl Shinn (1838–1886), American, 1866
 Howard Roberts, (1843–1900), American, c. 1866
 Herman van den Anker, (1832–1883), Dutch, 1868
 William Bouguereau, (1825–1893), French, 1868
 Louis Cabat, (1812–1893), French, c. 1868
 Milne Ramsey, (1847–1915), American, 1870
 Clement Nye Swift, (1846–1918), American, 1870
 Paul Sébillot, (1843–1918), French, 1873
 Julian Alden Weir, American, (1852–1919), 1874
 Augustus Burke, (1838–1891), Irish, 1875
 William Lamb Picknell, (1853–1897), American, 1876
 Alexandre Defaux, (1826–1900), French, 1876
 Thomas Hovenden, (1840–1895), Irish-American, 1876
 Frank C. Penfold, (1849–1921), American, 1877 until death
 Henry Mosler, (1841–1920), American, 1879
 Thomas Alexander Harrison, (1853–1930), American, 1880
 Paul Peel, (1860–1892), Canadian, 1881
 Henry Rodman Kenyon, (1861–1926), American, 1885, 1886 and 1888
 Arthur Wesley Dow, (1857–1922), American, 1885
 Paul Gauguin (1848–1903), French, 1886, 1888, 1889–1890 and 1894
 Émile Bernard (1868–1941), French, 1886, 1888 and 1891–1893
 Hubert Vos (1855–1935), Dutch, 1886
 Charles Laval (1862–1894), French, 1886
 Emile Schuffenecker (1851–1934), French, 1886
 Ferdinand du Puigaudeau (1864–1930), French, 1886
 Ernest de Chamaillard (1862–1930), French, 1888
 Meijer de Haan (1852–1895), Dutch, 1888
 Władysław Ślewiński (1854–1918), Polish, 1889
 Paul Sérusier (1864–1927), French, 1888, 1889 (and 1889, 1890)
 Armand Séguin (1869–1903), French, 1891–1893
 Charles Filiger (1863–1928), French, from 1888
 Jan Verkade (1868–1946), Dutch, 1891, 1892
 Mogens Ballin (1871–1914), Danish, 1891, 1892
 Henry Moret (1856–1913), French, from 1888
 Ernest Ponthier de Chamaillard (1862–1930), French, from 1888
 Gustave Loiseau (1865–1935), French, 1890
 Émile Jourdan (1860–1931), French, from 1888
 Jens Ferdinand Willumsen (1863–1958), Danish, 1890
 Roderic O'Conor (1860–1940), Irish, 1892
 Maurice Denis (1870–1943), French
  (1867–1949), French
 Robert Polhill Bevan, English, 1890, 1891, 1892, 1893 and 1894
 Cuno Amiet (1868–1961), Swiss, 1892
 Fredrich E. Wallace

See also 

 Musée des Beaux-Arts de Pont-Aven

References

Sources
 Bevan, Robert. Robert Bevan 1865–1925. A memoir by his son, Studio Vista, London 1965.

 Cariou, André: Les Peintres de Pont-Aven, Éditions Ouest-France, Rennes 1994  
 Jaworska, Wladyslawa: Gauguin et l'Ecole de Pont-Aven, Ides et Calendes, Neuchâtel 1971 (no ISBN); English edition: Gauguin and the Pont-Aven School, Thames and Hudson, London 1972 ; American edition: New York Graphic Society, Greenwich Connecticut 1972 
 Mathews, Nancy Mowll (2001). Paul Gauguin, an Erotic Life. New Haven, Connecticut: Yale University Press, .
 Thomson, Belinda (1987). Gauguin. London: Thames and Hudson. .

 
Breton art
Finistère
French art movements
French artist groups and collectives
Post-Impressionism
.